István Jónyer (born 4 August 1950 in Miskolc) is a male former international table tennis player from Hungary.

Table tennis career
He was one of the most dominant players of the sport in the 1970s and famous for inventing the sidespin loop shot. From 1968 to 1983 he won several medals in singles, doubles, and team events in the World Table Tennis Championships and in the Table Tennis European Championships. He is a 4-time World Champion and 4-time European Champion.

The eight World Championship medals included four gold medals; one in the men's singles, one in the men's team event and two in the men's doubles with Tibor Klampár and Gábor Gergely.

He also won an English Open title.

See also
 List of table tennis players
 List of World Table Tennis Championships medalists

References

External Links
Istvan Jonyer at Table Tennis Media

1950 births
Hungarian male table tennis players
Sportspeople from Miskolc
Living people